Keddington is a village and civil parish in the East Lindsey district of Lincolnshire, England.

Keddington Grade II* listed Anglican parish church is dedicated to St Margaret. The church was restored in 1871–73. It has a 15th-century wooden eagle lectern, and a south door with transom.  The eagle lectern is one of only six in England of its kind.

Other Grade II listed buildings include the remains of two locks on the disused Louth Canal, four farm houses, a cottage, and the remains of Louth Abbey. A Cistercian house, Louth Abbey was founded in 1139, and was dissolved at suppression in 1536. Still visible are earthworks and ruined chancel walls.

References

External links
"Keddington", Genuki.org.uk. Retrieved 29 June 2011
 

Villages in Lincolnshire
Civil parishes in Lincolnshire
East Lindsey District